Brooks House may refer to:

Brooks-Hughes House, Phenix City, Alabama
Brooks House (Searcy, Arkansas)
Paul Brooks House, Safford, Arizona, listed on the National Register of Historic Places (NRHP)
Jonathan Warner House, Chester, Connecticut, also known as Warner-Brooks House
Brooks House (Middlesboro, Kentucky), listed on the NRHP
Solomon Neill Brooks House, Shepherdsville, Kentucky
Luther Brooks House, Cambridge, Massachusetts
Daniel Brooks House, Lincoln, Massachusetts
Jonathan Brooks House, Medford, Massachusetts
Shepherd Brooks Estate, Medford, Massachusetts
Charles Brooks House, Medford, Massachusetts
Francis Brooks House, Reading, Massachusetts
James H. Brooks House, Somerville, Massachusetts
John Brooks House, Worcester, Massachusetts
Harold C. Brooks House, Marshall, Michigan, listed on the NRHP
Wright-Brooks House, Marshall, Michigan, listed on the NRHP
Brooks Farm, Troy, Michigan
Eastcliff (mansion), St. Paul, Minnesota, also known as the Edward and Markell Brooks House
Samuel Brooks House (Cornwall, New York)
Samuel Brooks House (Massachusetts), Concord, Massachusetts
James Brooks House (Dayton, Ohio)
J. Wesley Brooks House, Greenwood, South Carolina
Brooks Brothers Home, Sioux Falls, South Dakota, listed on the NRHP
Dr. Beauregard Martin Brooks House, Bath Springs, Tennessee
R.M. Brooks General Store and Residence, Rugby, Tennessee, listed on the NRHP
Rueben Brooks Farmstead, Elizabethton, Tennessee, listed on the NRHP
Wilks Brooks House, Memphis, Tennessee
William and Blanche Brooks House, Forney, Texas, listed on the NRHP
Jennie Brooks House, Bastrop, Texas, listed on the NRHP
Brooks-Wilbarger House, Bastrop, Texas, listed on the NRHP
Samuel Wallace Brooks House, Brownsville, Texas, listed on the NRHP
Brooks-Brown House, Dickinson, Virginia
Brooks House (Brattleboro, Vermont)
Kenneth and Edna Brooks House, Spokane, Washington, listed on the NRHP
Brooks Mansion, Washington, D.C.

See also
James Brooks House (disambiguation)
Samuel Brooks House (disambiguation)
Brook House (disambiguation)
Brook Farm (disambiguation)